Vassy Karagiorgos, known mononymously as Vassy (frequently stylised as VASSY, born 18 February 1983) is an Australian singer, songwriter and record producer.

Biography 
Vassy, whose parents are both from Greece, was discovered by Australian Radio Station Triple J after she won song of the year. Her single "We Are Young" reached No. 1 on the US Billboard Dance Chart, making her the first Australian Artist to go No. 1 with her solo single debut release. She is a certified RIAA Platinum and Gold recording artist.

In 2014, Vassy collaborated with David Guetta and Showtek on their song "Bad", which became 7 times double platinum and established her in the electronic dance music scene. In 2015, she collaborated with Tiësto and KSHMR on their track "Secrets", which reigned atop the Billboard Club chart and Beatport charts, and went straight to number No. 1 in 20 countries. In 2016, she released her single "Nothing to Lose" through Musical Freedom Records, co-produced by Tiësto. The same year, she was called by Afrojack to meet at his studio during one of her trips to Amsterdam. Vassy and Afrojack ended up playing and working on different concepts, with "Lost" being the final output out of their collaboration. The song was officially released through Armada Music one year later, in 2017, together with Oliver Rosa. "Lost" hit No. 1 on the Billboard Dance Club Songs chart in May 2018, marking Vassy's fourth Billboard No. 1 single.

Vassy's music incorporates dance, reggae and soul as a base for her vocal styling. Her music has received an array of accolades, including ARIA Awards and IDMA awards. She has performed in major EDM festivals around the world, including Ultra Music Festival in Miami, Tomorrowland Belgium, Electric Zoo NY, and Stereosonic Australia.

In popular culture
Her song was featured in the Tina Fey film Admission, Disney's Oscar-winning film Frozen, and in the campaign Gok Loves for Target Australia. Vassy's songs have also been featured in EA Games, Nickelodeon, Sketchers, Victoria's Secret, Pepsi commercials, and Grey's Anatomy.

Philanthropy 
Vassy is an ambassador for the NOH8 campaign and a spokesperson for Green IT. She also volunteers and teaches music workshops at AVIVA in Los Angeles.

Discography

Albums

Extended plays

Singles

As lead artist

As featured artist

Other appearances
 "Spotlight" (Victor Magan featuring Vassy and Juan Magan)
 "Miss Automatic" (Mark Angelo and Vassy featuring Epsilon) (No. 84 Greek Digital Songs)
 "Tokyo Style" (Future Boyz featuring Dave Audé and Vassy)
 "Burn" (Scooter and Vassy, 2016, on Ace)

Awards and nominations

See also
List of number-one dance hits (United States)
List of artists who reached number one on the US Dance chart

References

External links
 

Australian dance musicians
Australian women singer-songwriters
Living people
21st-century Australian singers
Australian people of Greek descent
People from Darwin, Northern Territory
Ultra Records artists
1983 births
21st-century Australian women singers
Naturalized citizens of the United States